Majur is a settlement and a municipality in central Croatia in the Sisak-Moslavina County. It has a population of 1,185, 70.04% of whom are Croats (2011 census) and 27.26% are ethnic Serbs.

By census 1991 Serbs were a majority 1,381 (54.05%), followed by Croats 1,036 (40.54%), Yugoslavs 72 (2.81%) and others 66 (2.58%). Majur is underdeveloped municipality which is statistically classified as the First Category Area of Special State Concern by the Government of Croatia.

History

Demographics

Settlements
The municipality consists of 11 settlements:

 Gornja Meminska, population 17
 Gornji Hrastovac, population 209
 Graboštani, population 134
 Kostrići, population 3
 Majur, population 324
 Malo Krčevo, population 19
 Mračaj, population 42
 Srednja Meminska, population 58
 Stubalj, population 186
 Svinica, population 114
 Veliko Krčevo, population 79

Sights

Notable natives and residents

References

Municipalities of Croatia
Populated places in Sisak-Moslavina County